This article provides a list of characters from the American television sitcom Drake & Josh along with brief synopsis of the time each of them spent on the show. Airing on Nickelodeon from January 11, 2004, to September 16, 2007, Drake & Josh was created by Dan Schneider, who also served as executive producer.

Main characters

Drake Parker
Drake Parker (Drake Bell) is Megan's older biological brother, Audrey's biological son and Walter's stepson. Drake is depicted as an easygoing, immature, confident, and womanizing teenage slacker. Although he often appears unintelligent, his under-achievement seems to be caused by apathy, and often makes impulsive decisions. The character Drake has a great interest in music, playing the electric guitar in a band and liking all genres of music, his favorites being rock and country. He can also play drums and bongos. He can easily manipulate Josh to get what he wants. He has a lot of success with girls, and much of the comedy is his effortless ability to get dates. Drake feels embarrassed about his new stepbrother at first but grows to accept Josh. Despite his desire to not spend time with Josh, Drake and Josh eventually become close friends and brothers.

Josh Nichols
Josh Nichols (Josh Peck) is Drake and Megan's stepbrother, Walter's biological son and Audrey's stepson. Unlike Drake, Josh is knowledgeable, diligent, caring, a good student and socially awkward. In the pilot episode, he had a job for the school newspaper in which he wrote advice for students under the name Miss Nancy. He begins working for Helen at the fictional Premiere movie theatre in season two. Unlike Drake, Josh often tries his best in challenging situations and uses his common sense, often repeating things for emphasis when anxious. Despite his logical mind and hard-working nature, Josh is prone to bad luck, especially with girls. However, later in the series he begins to date Mindy Crenshaw, his academic rival. His hobbies include cooking and performing magic tricks. Later in the series, Josh becomes popular and has better luck. He is obsessed with Oprah Winfrey and accidentally runs her over with his car in "Josh Runs into Oprah," leading her to get a restraining order against him. Peck described his character as having a Jackie Gleason quality, and said, "Not only can Josh do the physical comedy and the pratfalls, but he can also sell a sophisticated joke and a touching moment."

Audrey Parker-Nichols
Audrey Parker-Nichols (Nancy Sullivan) is Drake and Megan's biological mother, Josh's stepmother and Walter's wife. Her first name is never mentioned in the series, although a deleted scene from the series finale would have revealed Audrey. The scene would also specify her profession as a caterer.

She often tells the boys to be more mature. She upsets her husband, Walter, because of her preference for Bruce Winchill, his rival weatherman. Because Walter lacks respect from the boys, she usually has to punish them, although these punishments are usually unfair because most of the boys' wrongdoings are Megan's fault. As stepmother and stepson, Audrey and Josh have a very close relationship and he affectionately calls her "Mom" or "Mama." She is a nurturing and supportive mother. However, she is a bit gullible when it comes to her daughter Megan, especially when it is Megan's word against Drake and Josh.

Walter Nichols
Walter Nichols (Jonathan Goldstein) is Josh's biological father, Drake and Megan's stepfather and Audrey's husband. He is a meteorologist for a local TV news program in San Diego, but he is often wrong about the weather. Walter is often slow-witted, awkward, out-of-touch, and old-fashioned. As a result, he lacks the respect of his stepchildren, who refer to him by his first name. When Megan calls him by his first name, he always asks, "When did she start calling me Walter?" and Audrey replies, "I don't know." He is also oblivious and cynical regarding Megan's pranks, which have caused the boys many punishments. However, starting in the episode "The Demonator," Walter slowly begins to notice Megan's evil ways. A running gag involves a rivalry between him and Bruce Winchill, an unseen weatherman from another station. He hates that Winchill is so popular, as he is always right with his predictions. He even forbids the use of Winchill's name in the family home.

Megan Parker
Megan Parker (Miranda Cosgrove) is the tomboyish and mischievous younger biological sister of Drake, stepsister of Josh, biological daughter of Audrey and stepdaughter of Walter. Megan often references a best friend named Janie and often refers to her older brothers as "boobs." She is essentially the main antagonist of the series, usually bullies her brothers, although sometimes Megan helps them in episodes like “The Gary Grill”, “Honor Council”, “The Drake and Josh Inn” and “Drake and Josh: Go Hollywood.” It has also been shown that she is very wise and intelligent; she can pull off very severe, torturous and sometimes complicated (or even potentially dangerous) pranks on her brothers, all while ensuring that her parents think of her as being a sweet, angelic, harmless, and innocent little girl. However, in numerous episodes like “The Bet” and “The Affair,” Megan had made rude remarks to Drake and Josh in front of her mother, who does not intervene, and also in “Really Big Shrimp” when she sassed off to Lula when she rudely demanded her guacamole, with Walter intervening instead of her mother.  Another episode shows that she has a hidden computerized monitor in her room, giving her surveillance of the house to aid in her pranks against Drake and Josh. Most of the time throughout the series, Megan is very vain, mean-spirited, selfish, snotty, rude, conceited, snobbish, argumentative, spiteful, disrespectful, hypocritical, deceitful, obnoxious, arrogant, bossy, spoiled, vindictive, and cruel to her brothers. However, despite her mistreatment of them, Megan loves her brothers deep down. She had shown them genuine love and support when they uncovered that her boyfriend Corey (Christian Vandal) had been cheating on her with another girl named Monica. Her character is similar to characters such as Sam Puckett and Chuck Chambers from iCarly and Jade West from Victorious, both shows of which were created by Dan Schneider.

Recurring characters

Helen Dubois
Helen Ophelia Dubois (Yvette Nicole Brown) is the manager of the Premiere Theater, connected to the Premiere Galleria mall. She is Josh's boss at the theater and is known for her intimidating demeanor, loud voice, and demanding attitude towards employees. She adores Drake but dislikes Josh despite the hard work he puts in at the theater. She starred in the hit 1970's TV series called Happy Times, which is intended to reference the real-life series called 'Good Times'. She married Buzz Baxter in "Drake & Josh: Really Big Shrimp" but divorced him sometime before Merry Christmas, Drake & Josh after five weeks. Yvette Nicole Brown played Helen for most of the series, except the season two episode "Little Diva," in which Frances Callier took over the role.

Helen appears in a 2011 episode of Victorious in which she becomes the principal of Hollywood Arts High School. She later appears in a 2015 episode of Game Shakers, in which she hosts her talk show titled The Helen Show.

"Crazy" Steve

Steve (Jerry Trainor) is an employee at the Premiere movie theater who is noted for his emotional and mental instability, lashing out at co-workers, strangers, and passersby over little things. He is also incredibly sensitive. Steve takes offense at the slightest of subjects or even the most thoroughly minor hints at insults, hollering at others for interrupting him or denying his questions, desires, or offers. Steve's utter lack of sanity has earned him a dangerously unpredictable reputation amongst colleagues, to the extent where he finds immense frustration in following along with episodes of Dora the Explorer, screaming at the animated characters on the screen. In seasons 2 and 3, he had a lot of hair, but in season 4, his head was shaved. He appears in the program's 2008 Christmas special, most notably towards its conclusion, where he shreds hunks of cheese in a wood chipper to grant his friends' wish for a white Christmas. He later appeared in an episode of the series Sam & Cat where he is revealed to have been placed at a mental institution for the sick, with a restrictive mask over his face.

Mindy Crenshaw
Mindy (Allison Scagliotti) is a clever but arrogant girl at school who is always trying to be better than Josh, who is her rival. She also shows an intense dislike for Drake, and the feeling is mutual. For example, in "Honor Council," she took apart Mrs. Hayfer's car and rebuilt it in the middle of her classroom to frame Drake for the prank and have him suspended. For this misdeed, Mindy was sent to a mental hospital, causing a temporary departure from the series. Still, she eventually reappeared in "Mindy's Back" to compete in the school science fair. Later on, she became Josh's on-again off-again girlfriend, and the two enjoy each other's company. One of Mindy's well-known character traits is her genius-level intellect and scientific talents. She defeats Josh yearly in the science fair except for one year after they started to date, where she let him win, which she enjoys rubbing in his face at times. She also cloned her pet Cockapoo, and has a love of sharks.

Craig Ramirez and Eric Blonowitz
Craig (Alec Medlock) and Eric (Scott Halberstadt) are a duo of stereotypical "nerdy" honor students that are always being exploited by Drake, mostly due to his hare-brained schemes. Drake often mistakes Eric for Craig when Craig is absent. Craig corrected him once in "Eric Punches Drake," and Drake sarcastically said, "It matters," suggesting that he has no interest in correcting his mistakes. Eric first appeared in the pilot episode as an extra and along with his best friend, Craig, a few times in Seasons 2 and 3, but they occur more frequently in Season 4 and appear in the series finale Really Big Shrimp. They usually are good friends and good, but not free of a selfish side. Drake is so unkind to them that anytime they try to talk with him, he rudely shuts the door in their faces and tells them that there are many reasons why they do not have girlfriends. Eric left for Puerto Rico in the final episode, "Dance Contest." Craig and Eric appear with another Drake & Josh character, Gavin, in the 2010 iCarly episode "iStart a Fan War", implying that the two series take place within the same universe. It is revealed in the episode "Who's Got Game" that Craig and Eric do not consider themselves to be friends with Drake because of the bad things he has done to them.

Gavin Mitchell
Gavin (Jake Farrow) works with Josh at the Premiere, and he has a mullet-like haircut similar in fashion to Rod Stewart (in "Who's Got Game" he got a perm). Throughout the series, a running gag involved Helen asking him to tell Josh to clean something unusual in the theater. He usually declines to do it himself when Josh asks if he would do it. He then cleans up the mess himself - telling Josh, "I got it." He also has a crush on Audrey. He can get away with anything at work, like taking a nap on the roof. He first appeared in "Driver's License" and made an appearance in Merry Christmas, Drake & Josh. Gavin appears in iCarly in Season 4 episode "iStart a Fan War" with Craig and Eric.

Mrs. Hayfer
Mrs. Hayfer (Julia Duffy) is the boys' English teacher who adores Josh due to his hard-working personality but hates Drake because of his consistently poor performance in school; likewise, as noted by his doodles of her in his notebook, as seen in "Honor Council," Drake hates her in return. In the episode "Mean Teacher," Mrs. Hayfer is shown to hate Drake for no apparent reason as it is shown that when he answered a question correctly, she dubbed it incorrect and appointed the same problem correct to another student right next to him as well as grading a flawless report he did with a "D−" again for no logical reason. In fact, her catchphrase is "I hate you, Drake," with Drake responding, "I know." She also always says, "To the nurse!" which is her way of telling people to leave her classroom. In "Little Sibling," Mrs. Hayfer says it to Josh when she wanted to have a private talk with Drake. Mrs. Hayfer has a daughter named Kelly, who Drake briefly dates, much to her discontent. In "Honor Council," she comes into the classroom to find her car parked where the boys' seats are initially and accuses Drake of putting the car there, but her star student, Mindy, is the real culprit. Drake hates Mrs. Hayfer so much that he wishes she would die, as seen in the episode, "Megan's First Kiss," in which Josh says, "You're not gonna believe this!" and Drake asks in an anxious and excited tone, "Mrs. Hayfer died?!"

Mrs. Hayfer has a Rottweiler named Tiberius, who appears in the season 4 episode "Vicious Tiberius" and is violent towards Drake and Josh, who had agreed to house sit for her.

She has a brief appearance in Merry Christmas, Drake & Josh, where Drake accidentally hits a fire hydrant while driving, resulting in water getting sprayed all over her. She then points out and yells her famous line: "I hate you, Drake Parker!" Meaning that even though Drake and Josh have graduated from Bellview High, Mrs. Hayfer still hates Drake.

In the season 2 finale, "Honor Council," Josh mentions her full name as Alice Hayfer. However, in "Vicious Tiberious," a video shows her full name as being Linda Hayfer.

Dr. Jeff Glazer
Dr. Glazer (Roark Critchlow) is a doctor who lives across the street from the boys. He is always called on whenever a severe emergency happens at their house. Although he always seems kind while performing medical procedures for the boys, he still leaves them with a ridiculously high bill for his services (he once charged $100 for diagnosing a sheep as pregnant after it had already given birth and an extra $50 not to tell Audrey and Walter, charged $300 for diagnosing Drake's facial rash, and charged $500 for diagnosing Ashley Blake's accident after she got hit in the head with a bucket). He first appeared in "The Bet," and he last appeared in "Sheep Thrills."

Bruce Winchill
Although Bruce Winchill is never seen in Drake & Josh, he is mentioned throughout the series. Megan and Audrey have a crush on him because he has good hair. He is a rival weatherman of Walter, and he always gets the weather right.

Leah
Leah (Cathy Shim) is an employee at The Premiere who appears in Season 4. She is frequently scared of Crazy Steve due to his outbursts.

Minor characters

Grammy Nichols
Grammy (Randee Heller) is Josh's grandmother and Walter's mother. She loves Josh and Megan, but she hates Drake due to his lack of responsibility, laziness, and sassy attitude. In her only appearance in "Grammy," she expresses anger towards Drake when he decides to go to a concert even though Audrey and Walter said he could not. At the end of the episode, Grammy shows affection toward Drake when he tells his parents the truth. She is later mentioned frequently. She sent gifts to Josh many times. She is last mentioned in "Merry Christmas, Drake and Josh."

Papa Nichols
Papa Nichols (Vernon Roberts) is Josh's great-grandfather, Walter's grandfather and Grammy's father, and a World War II veteran who appears only in the episode "The Demonator," in which he had surgery and is resting at the family's house. While their parents go out to the Newsie Awards, Drake, Josh, and Megan sneak out of the house to ride a roller coaster called The Demonator. They have Craig and Eric watch Papa Nichols. When Papa Nichols wakes up disoriented, he thinks he is back in World War II and pranks Craig and Eric, believing they are "German nerds." At the end of "The Demonator," Walter tries to wake Papa Nichols up but is punched by him. Papa Nichols then calls Walter a "German."

He is later mentioned once by Josh in "The Wedding" when Josh told Drake that he can't call Craig and Eric as Josh remembered that Papa Nichols broke Eric's cell phone.

Aunt Catherine
Catherine is Drake and Josh's great-aunt. She is mentioned in the episode "The Wedding," where it is revealed that she is getting married and collects hair from people she does not know. Although she is never seen, she is described as being mean and is hated by her family, including Josh. She also owns a beach-house, which the family wants to receive. According to Drake, she is "old and gross."

Jackie
Jackie (Robin Sydney) is obsessed with Drake and appeared in a total of four episodes. She would come into the scene randomly (usually at the end, specifically when something positive happens to Drake) and shout hysterically, "I love you! Bye!" In response, Drake and/or Josh would ask, "Who are you? or Who is she?".

Ashley Blake
Ashley Blake (Skyler Samuels) is a child actress who appeared as the main antagonist in the episode "Little Diva." Portrayed as a spoiled and insolent Hollywood child actress, she is seen differently from the rest of the world, who are oblivious to her temperament.

Wendy
"Wendy" (Alyson Stoner) is a girl that had an obsessive crush on Drake in the episode "Number 1 Fan", her only appearance. She is approximately the same age as Megan and is in a camp club with Megan and some other children. She reveals that her real name is Melissa, although she does not like the name and goes by Wendy.

Sammy
Sammy (Jordan Wright) is a young child that Drake needed to take care of as part of a Big Sibling program because he got in trouble for lying to Mrs. Hayfer about being in class on time. Drake proceeds to take care of Sammy, although Sammy wants Josh to be his big sibling. Sammy considers Josh to be the coolest guy ever, something that most characters think about Drake.

Tyler
Tyler (Skyler Gisondo) is Megan's assistant who appeared in "I Love Sushi". When Megan gets too busy to prank Drake and Josh, she hires him to prank them. Tyler makes Drake and Josh eat nachos with "sticky cheese" (hot glue and nacho cheese) and throws an egg at Sergeant Doty's back thinking that Drake and Josh did it. When Drake and Josh come home, Megan reveals that she fired Tyler.

Robbie
Robbie (Matthew Evans) is Drake and Josh's neighbor. In "Tree House", he angrily walks to his parents and eventually screams after his tree house was destroyed by Drake, Josh, and Megan. Josh tried to cheer him up with his remote controlled car until he screams again when his remote controlled car got destroyed after a piece of his tree house fell down which causes the Parker-Nichols family to quickly leave the backyard. He appeared again in "Josh is Done" when he retrieved his Sit and Bounce that Drake had stolen from him.

Trevor
Trevor (Taran Killam) is Drake's absent-minded friend and Scottie's older brother. Even though he only appeared in "Dune Buggy," he is mentioned several times in the series, and his voice is heard over the phone in "Josh Runs into Oprah." Trevor gets a brain scan every month due to his lack of intelligence, as seen in "Dune Buggy." In "The Wedding," the boys use his old car (a 1970s Chevrolet El Camino) to get to their great aunt Catherine's wedding, but it breaks down and later catches fire.

Yooka
Yooka (Anastasia Baranova) is Josh's foreign pen pal who appeared in "We're Married". She comes to visit Drake and Josh from her fictional country of Yudonia, and Drake takes a strong liking to her, spending more time with her than Josh can. Drake and Josh soon learn that she is homesick, so they hold a Yudonian friendship ceremony, which turns out to be a marriage ceremony between her and Drake. Drake tries to carry on with life as normal, but she is serious about being married, and matters only get worse when her parents come to visit. So Drake and Josh come up with a plan to annul the marriage, serving her family goat. At the end of "We're Married", Drake sobs over losing her.

Clayton
Clayton (Josh Sussman) is one of the nerdy children at school. He has speech problems since he mumbles, and no one can understand what he is saying. Even Craig and Eric call him a "nerd," considering that they are nerds themselves. He appears only in "Josh is Done" and "Eric Punches Drake." In "Eric Punches Drake," he begins to dislike Drake when Drake spits blue mouthwash into his bottled water. He even goes as far as to find out where Drake and Josh live so that he could repeat "Why?" However, since "Eric Punches Drake" took place after "Josh is Done," fans have speculated that Drake spitting mouthwash into his bottle would be considered revenge for the chemistry incident that Clayton caused on Drake.

Thornton
Thornton (Jeff Braine) is Drake and Josh's friend. In "Battle of Panthatar", Drake and Josh are invited to his sweet 16 party at Club Diego which will air on MTV live. However, their invitations are revoked after he catches Drake kissing a girl named Maria, who unbeknownst to him was Thornton's girlfriend. To get into the party, Josh pushes Drake into giving him his autographed Abbey Road album. Even though he accepts the present, he still refuses to invite them into the party. As a result, Drake and Josh decide to get revenge by crashing and ruining the party being dressed up as the Red Sky Nauts from Galaxy Wars to steal the album back. When they are discovered, they are able to escape with Drake secretly getting the album back.

Janie
Janie (Jasmine McNeal) is Megan's best friend. She is mentioned in several Season 4 episodes and appears in "Megan's Revenge" and "Megan's First Kiss."

Corey
A boy who was dating Megan and Monica simultaneously in the episode, “Megan’s First Kiss.” He breaks up with Megan at first due to Drake and Josh’s strange antics during their date. He agrees to give Megan another chance, but instead, he dates Monica the same day, which causes Josh to inform Drake of him. In the end, the two girls end up breaking up with him, and as Drake and Josh try to teach him a lesson on not to cheat on any girl he dates, he ends up attacking them and breaking their bones.

Monica
A girl who was dating Megan's boyfriend, Corey, for one month, unbeknownst to Megan and Monica, respectively. Josh witnessed the two on a date while he was picking up his paycheck from Helen and immediately told Drake about it when he returned home. Monica eventually breaks up with Corey after finding out, through Drake and Josh, that he had cheated on her. Megan proceeds to do so as well. Monica's only appearance was in the episode "Megan's First Kiss."

Vince
Vince (D. Elliot Woods) is a helicopter pilot who appears in "Helicopter." He gives Drake a lesson about skydiving, and he takes him and Josh on a ride in his helicopter. However, he becomes unconscious after hitting his head on a fire extinguisher. When the boys try to wake him up, Josh accidentally sprays him out of the helicopter with the fire extinguisher. When Drake and Josh get home, Vince comes in angrily and gives Walter a $400,000 bill for the damaged helicopter. Drake and Josh, knowing the consequences, ground themselves for two weeks.

Karate instructor and coffee shop owner
Toshi Toda played him. He first appears in the pilot as Josh's karate instructor. He is later seen in "First Crush," saying that his karate place burnt down. Since then, he has become the owner of a coffee shop where he held auditions for a band. He banned Drake from entering the shop because Drake had a snake in his backpack, which Megan put there. However, Cathy, Josh's crush at the time, spoke to him about giving them another chance.

Drew and Jerry
Drew (James Immekus) and Jerry (Stephen Markarian) are two boys who look and act like Drake and Josh. They appeared only in the episode "Drew & Jerry." Drew plays the saxophone and flirts with girls, while Jerry likes pool, video games, and magic tricks. Josh began hanging out with Drew, making Drake jealous, which led to the friendship between him and Jerry. Aside from being a good comedian, Jerry also plays a lot of pool at the Premiere. Josh and Drew then attend a movie premiere that Drake and Josh will see initially, so Drake angrily gets back at Josh by spending the day with Jerry fishing. However, during an argument, Drake has Jerry do a magic trick that involved cutting a girl's ponytail and then putting it back clear in position. Josh then tells Drew to entertain everyone in the Premiere by playing his saxophone. A talent agent sees them and decides to give them their TV show, a comedy about two brothers. Drake and Josh then watch the show themselves.

Henry Doheny
Henry Doheny (Steve Tom) is a formerly famous magician who moves in with the family in the episode "The Great Doheny." Josh, Walter, and Megan idolize him while Drake hates him. Doheny does magic wherever he goes, such as interfering with random people and doing magic tricks for them, and even puts a sandwich inside his stomach without eating it. When Drake could no longer stand Doheny being in the house, he tried to harm him with a baseball bat, but Josh decided to help him become famous again. Megan came up with a trick called "The Box of Impalement," which backfired due to putting Doheny in a large box and sticking swords into his body, killing him. However, at the funeral, Henry returned to life and regained his career. At the end of "The Great Doheny", he went off to Las Vegas to perform there for four years.

Lenny
Lenny Spodnick (Fred Stoller) is the stadium clerk who appeared in "Foam Finger". He worked at the Padres stadium selling foam fingers, but he got promoted to selling bobbleheads. When Megan locates him, he came to Drake and Josh's house to help the family figure out what really happened when Drake and Josh were 8 years old. He told everyone the story of what actually happened, where Drake and Josh were fighting over the last foam finger, but Megan actually threw a cookie at them which caused Drake and Josh to fight each other causing several police officers to stop their fight. After his flashback ended, he helped Drake and Josh stop arguing about one another "ruining each other's childhood". Once he leaves the house, he gave out one of his bobbleheads he sold at the Padres stadium.

Coach Davis
Coach Davis (Charles Levin) is Josh's football coach who appeared in "Football". He offers Josh to bake brownies for his football team. Megan puts flower dirt inside the batter, which grossed out the football players. He told Josh that he'll end up playing center. Josh, worried that he will get mauled from the opposing team, wants to drop out. He also tells Zeke, pretending to be Josh, they are forfeiting. Josh doesn't want to let the team and school down and decides to play for real.

Mr. Talbot
Mr. Talbot (Andy Milder) is the Remedial English teacher (a class with a lack of discipline with its poorly behaved students) who appeared in "Little Sibling". Mr. Talbot always tied up before class begins, and the students remain the class time to cause mayhem. However, Mrs. Hayfer sent Drake back to Remedial English again, but Josh walked in told Mr. Talbot that the principal wanted to see Drake. Mr. Talbot let Drake go out Josh but it was just a lie so that Drake get away from Remedial English.

Mr. Roland
Mr. Roland (Tom Virtue) is Drake and Josh's chemistry teacher. In "Josh Is Done", Mr. Roland sent Josh out of his class for being late to class when the students begin their chemistry exam. In "Eric Punches Drake", he told Josh and Mindy about new chemistry text books that have arrived and informed Drake about having no blimps in the hallway.

Peggy
Peggy Sherman (Allison Dunbar) is a producer for "Good Morning Today". In "The Affair", Drake and Josh spy on Walter while he's dating her. Later on, Drake and Josh spy on them having lunch at a restaurant. When they make a distraction by throwing a meatball at Walter, he leaves to get cleaned up, giving Drake and Josh the opportunity to confront Peggy. Josh pours spaghetti over her head, and Drake splatters a cake in her face just as Walter returns. Peggy angrily tells Walter that she is no longer interesting in pursuing him and leaves. After this, Walter angrily tells the boys that she is in fact a senior producer for Good Morning Today, and was offering Walter a spot as a weatherman on the show.

Drake's girlfriends
Drake has several girlfriends throughout the series.

Susan (Ashley Drane) is Drake's girlfriend in the episode "Believe Me, Brother," in which she secretly flirts with Josh. She is later exposed, and as revenge, Drake and Josh plant purple paint in her locker, and it is splattered all over her when she opens the door.

Kelly Hayfer (Chelsea Brummet) is Mrs. Hayfer's daughter. She appears only in the episode "Mean Teacher," in which she dates Drake. She has a laughing problem throughout the episode, which secretly annoys Drake. However, he does not break up with her, fearing retaliation from Mrs. Hayfer. Although Kelly loves Drake, she ends the relationship – much to his excitement – because she does not believe it is working out.

Tori (Torrey DeVitto) is Drake's girlfriend in the episode "Playing the Field," in which he breaks up with her. When Tori quickly begins dating other boys, Drake dates Liza Tupper – who he has nicknamed Hot Liza – to make Tori jealous. In the episode "Dr. Phyllis Show," it is mentioned that Liza is the daughter of Dr. Phyllis, the host of a television talk program when the host becomes angry after Drake insults Liza by calling her dumb and a bad kisser.

Lucy (Gabrielle Christian) is introduced in the episode "Girl Power," in which she physically defends Drake against a football player. Drake then considers ending their relationship, as he does not want to be with someone stronger than him. Later in the episode, Drake and Lucy wrestle to determine who is stronger, although Drake is hesitant about wrestling a girl.

Carly (Brittany Curran) becomes Drake's girlfriend in the episode "Who's Got Game," in which Josh challenges Drake on who can get the most dates. Drake meets her at the CD shop where she works, and he falls in love with her at first sight. Carly grows fond of Drake, too, after meeting him but furiously dumps him when she finds out about the bet, thinking Drake is just using her. He then proves to her that he can be honest and they continue dating.

Lucy and another girl, Christine (Sarah Christine Smith), appear as ex-girlfriends of Drake in the episode "The Storm." They become friends with Carly, who is still dating Drake. The episode marks their final appearance on the series. Drake flirts with other girls, including Grant Widner, in subsequent episodes such as "Tree House."

Drake's band
Drake has a band in which he is the frontman.

Scottie (Johnny Lewis) is the drummer of Drake's band and is Trevor's younger brother. He is considered to be unintelligent, according to Drake and the other band members. Rina (Molly Orr) is the bassist of Drake's band, while Paul (Jeremy Ray Valdez) is the rhythm guitarist. They only appeared in four episodes in Season 1. Drake and the three band members are detained at a concert because Scottie photocopied their tickets in the episode "Grammy," the three's final appearance.

In the episode "Megan's New Teacher," Drake has 5th grader Neil Kramer (Ridge Canipe) play in his band after his original drummer leaves. Neil initially fails a pop quiz by Josh, who is serving temporarily as a student-teacher. Neil's mother then forbids him from playing in the band, so Drake and Megan get Josh fired, leading to Neil playing for Drake's band at the Premiere's third anniversary. Neil does not appear in any subsequent episodes.

Three band members, Gary (Dan Mott), Julio (Shiloh Fernandez), and an unnamed guitarist, appear in "The Storm." Gary is the goofy and self-absorbed drummer. He has a tattoo of a foot on his chest and likes to wear girls shirts, including his sister's blouse and Megan's panda shirt. Julio is the band's bassist, and he was mentioned in the episode "Josh Runs Into Oprah." The rhythm guitarist is an African American but is only seen with the band.

References

Characters
Lists of American sitcom television characters